Crewe Heritage Centre is a railway museum located in Crewe, England. Managed by the Crewe Heritage Trust, the museum is located between the railway station and the town centre; the site was the location of the 'Old Works' which was demolished in the early 1980s.

History
The centre was established in the old London, Midland and Scottish Railway yard, which was once part of Crewe Works, between the junction to Chester and the West Coast Main Line. It was officially opened by Queen Elizabeth II, accompanied by the Duke of Edinburgh, on 24 July 1987. It was renamed in 1992 as Crewe Railway Age by the owning registered charity but, after the management of the centre was taken over by a new group of volunteers, the museum returned to its original name of Crewe Heritage Centre in early 2008.

Exhibits
The centre has a series of exhibits, ranging from the only surviving APT-P train, miniature railways, three open signal boxes (Crewe Station A, Crewe North Junction and Exeter West) and a varied collection of standard gauge steam, diesel and electric locomotives, as well as occasional visiting locomotives. The Main Exhibition Hall features many artefacts and exhibits associated with Crewe, from its locomotive and carriage construction to its famous junction railway station. Brake Van rides are available to the public during special events.

Advanced Passenger Train

Built by British Rail (BR) the 1970s and 1980s, this Class 370 Advanced Passenger Train (APT) is the only surviving APT set. Numbered 370 003/006, it is open at all times with an occasional cafe run from the original buffet car (selected days only). The APT-P museum can be found inside one of the carriages, with photographs on display from the APT project. The set was tilted for the first time in preservation in 2013. In early 2018, an additional surviving APT powercar (M49006) arrived at the museum. It is displayed separately alongside the main set.

Miniature Railway
Constructed in 1992, the Crewe Heritage Centre Miniature Railway is a 600 metre long 184mm (7.25 in) gauge ride, the railway takes visitors on a trip from ‘Crewe Old Works’ station to ‘Spider Bridge’ station and the optional return journey. The railway includes a mixture of Steam, Petrol and Battery Electric locomotives; rides on this attraction are included in the museum admission price.

Exhibition Hall
The Heritage Centre is also home to a 1,000m2 Exhibition Hall, which doubles both as an event space and as the main museum building. It features displays and exhibits about the town of Crewe. During the 2018/19 closed season, the building underwent a light refurbishment; this included replacement of the original 1987 entrance doors and a full internal repaint.

Signal boxes
Crewe Station A: Open for display purposes, this box was moved onto the site after closure in 1985. 
Crewe North Junction: Built in 1939 and designed to withstand the Luftwaffe bombs of World War II, the box is constructed out of concrete and has an 46 cm (18") thick roof and 38 cm (15") thick walls. Located between the West Coast Main Line and Crewe-Chester line, its location is perfect for viewing passing mainline trains. Demonstrations of how the box was used often take place and are linked to a simulator. In 1987, the building was extended to provide more room for the Heritage Centre, including a cafe and small shop, and to include a large U.S. model railway.

Exeter West: Used to control the split at Exeter between the Great Western Railway and the Southern Railway. With 131 levers, it was a Special Class A signal box, with only the best signalmen authorised to operate it. Since being rebuilt at Crewe, volunteers operate it on every weekend using a demonstration 1960s timetable; this includes the hectic Summer Saturday service, which saw famous expresses such as the Torbay Express, Atlantic Coast Express and the Cornishman.

Examples of stock held

See also

List of museums in Cheshire

Distinguish from
Crewe Railroad Museum in Crewe, Virginia, USA

References

Further reading

External links

Buildings and structures in Crewe
Railway museums in England
Museums in Cheshire